The Moment is the third album by Irish singer/songwriter Jimmy MacCarthy, released in 2002 by his own record label, Ride On Records.

Track listing
 "The Music of Love" - 4:18
 "The Moment"  - 3:22
 "Juggler"  - 4:04
 "Original Doubt"  - 4:11
 "Baby's Broken Heart" - 3:16
 "Change In A Minute" - 3:24
 "Still In Love" - 4:24
 "The Contender" - 3:08
 "My Singing Bird" - 2:46
 "Love Don't Fail Me" - 4:23
 "Don't You Still Smile" - 3:16

2002 albums
Jimmy MacCarthy albums